Helcogramma albimacula is a species of triplefin blenny in the genus Helcogramma. It was described by Jeffery T. Williams and Jeffrey C. Howe in 2003. This species is endemic to the Philippines.

References

albimacula
Fish described in 2003